Acoustic Soul is the debut studio album by American singer India Arie. It was released on March 27, 2001, by Motown. The album received seven nominations at the 44th Grammy Awards, including Album of the Year and Best R&B Album. Acoustic Soul was certified double platinum by the Recording Industry Association of America (RIAA) on December 17, 2003, denoting shipments in excess of two million copies in the United States.

Critical reception
Upon its release, the album received acclaim from music critics.

Track listing

Sample credits
 "Video" contains an interpolation of "Fun" by Brick.
 "Nature" contains an interpolation of "Quiet Storm" by Mobb Deep.

Personnel

Musicians
India Arie – vocals, acoustic guitar
Mark Batson – organ, synthesizer, bass, percussion, drums, keyboards, programming, Mellotron, Fender Rhodes
Carlos "6 July" Broady – programming
John Catchings – cello
Larry Goldings – organ, Wurlitzer, string contractor
Steve Grossman – percussion, drums
Tony Harrell – keyboards
Kerisha Hicks – background vocals
Judeth Insel – viola
Avery Johnson – bass
Bashiri Johnson – percussion
Doug Kahan – bass
Terry MacMillan – percussion
Blue Miller – acoustic guitar, guitar, electric guitar, programming, vocals, background vocals
Bob Power – bass, guitar, conductor, programming
Marlene Rice – violin
Ralph Rolle – drums
Joyce Simpson – background vocals
David Spak – percussion
Laurneá Wilkerson – background vocals
Nioka Workman – cello

Technical
Producers: India Arie, Mark Batson, Carlos "6 July" Broady, Blue Miller, Bob Power
Executive producer: Kedar Massenburg
Engineers: Kevin Haywood, Avery Johnson, Jim Lightman, Blue Miller, Mark Niemiec, Bob Power, Lovis Scalise, Mike Tocci
Mixing: Kevin Haywood, George Karras, Jim Lightman, Chris Mazer, Blue Miller, Bob Power, Mike Shipley, Alvin Speights, Dave Way
Mastering: Chris Athens
Programming: Mark Batson
Assistant producer: Jason Breckling
String arrangements: Mark Batson
String engineer: Jon Smeltz
Creative director: Sandy Brummels
Product manager: Liz Loblack
Art direction: Annalee Valencia
Design: Annalee Valencia
Photography: Kwaku Alston, Michael Benabib

Charts

Weekly charts

Year-end charts

Certifications

Release history

Notes

References

Further reading

External links
 Album review at BBC Online
 Album review at Entertainment.ie
 Album review at Los Angeles Times

2001 debut albums
Albums produced by Mark Batson
Albums recorded at Electric Lady Studios
India Arie albums
Motown albums